Medi Bayreuth, official stylized as medi bayreuth, is a German professional basketball club that is based in Bayreuth, Germany. It was re-founded as BBC Bayreuth in 1999. The team plays in the Basketball Bundesliga (BBL), the highest division of basketball in Germany. Since 2013, the company medi is the head and naming sponsor of the team.

History
The club was founded as the basketball section of Post SV Bayreuth in 1975 and was one of the clubs that established the second division of professional basketball in Germany. In its debut season, the team immediately promoted to the first tier Basketball Bundesliga. In 1979, the basketball team separated from Post SV and the club was re-founded as USC Bayreuth. After the 1983–84 season the team relegated form the Bundesliga. Following this event, the club merged with TTBG Steiner-Optik Bayreuth, a former table tennis club, to form BG Steiner Bayreuth.

As Steiner Bayreuth, the team had some great successes. The club immediately returned to the highest level and years later started to win several trophies in Germany. In 1988 and 1989 the team won the BBL-Pokal and in the 1988–89 season the team was crowned German national champions after winning the Bundesliga.

In 1997, longtime sponsor Steiner left the club and the club started to get in financial trouble. Along with the financial crisis, the team also had a sportive crisis. In 1999, the team relegated form the Bundesliga to the second division because of financial troubles. In the following seasons, Bayreuth spent its time in the second division ProA.

Bayreuth eventually returned to the highest level. The club won the 2009–10 season's German 2nd Division championship, and thus earned promotion to the Bundesliga for the 2010–11 season. Before the 2013–14 season, the club's name was changed to medi bayreuth for sponsorship reasons. The new team colors became black, lime green and pink.

Bayreuth had an outstanding 2016–17 season, as the team of Raoul Korner finished fourth in the BBL regular season with a 22–10 record. In the play-offs the team was eliminated by fifth-seeded Oldenburg. However, the placement of the club qualified Bayreuth for the 2017–18 Basketball Champions League which would be the first European campaign for the club. With an 8–6 record in the regular season, Bayreuth advanced to the play-offs were the team eliminated Turkish side Beşiktaş in the eight-finals. However, in the quarter-finals the club was eliminated by fellow German side Riesen Ludwigsburg.

Arena
The club's regular home arena is the Oberfrankenhalle, which has a seating capacity of 4,000 people.

Club identity

Logos

Uniforms

Players

Current roster

Notable players

Frank Bartley (born 1994), basketball player for Ironi Ness Ziona of the Israeli Basketball Premier League

Trophies
German Championship:
Champions: 1988–89
German Cup:
Champions: 1987–88, 1988–89
ProA / 2. Basketball Bundesliga
Champions: 2008–09

Season by season

References

External links
 
Eurobasket.com Team Page

1975 establishments in West Germany
Basketball clubs in Bavaria
Basketball teams established in 1975
Bayreuth
Sport in Upper Franconia